Golden West Broadcasters was an umbrella investment company founded and co-owned by late actor/singer Gene Autry (1907–1998) and late two-time All-American and former Detroit Lions tackle Bob Reynolds (1914–1997). Headquartered in Hollywood, California, in addition to broadcast television and radio, Autry and Reynolds also invested in real estate as well as ownership stakes in the Hollywood Stars baseball team of the Pacific Coast League and the Los Angeles Angels of Major League Baseball. The company owned and operated several television and radio stations from 1951 to 1982, and also provided services to and for other third-party, non-owned stations through the Golden West Radio Network.

History 

In 1951, Autry and Reynolds formed Golden West Broadcasters with their acquisition of KMPC (now KSPN) 710 AM in Los Angeles, while Reynolds served and worked as the station's manager. They followed that up by taking its first ever television station, KOPO-TV (now CBS affiliate KOLD-TV) in Tucson, Arizona to the air in two years later, and then with additional acquisitions including most importantly, KTLA in Los Angeles, which continues to operate from the very same site at which the company and the station co-existed on Sunset Boulevard in Hollywood to this very day. Over time, Autry took control of the company with other co-investors in later years. Golden West also operated several cable television systems across the country during the 1970s and into the 1980s. Autry began their gradual exit from the broadcasting industry beginning in 1982 with the sale of KTLA to Kohlberg Kravis Roberts, culminating with the sale of KSCA 101.9 FM in Glendale, California – within the Los Angeles area, to Heftel Broadcasting Corporation in 1997.

Broadcast Properties

Television 

 1 Operated in facilities shared with the company.
 2 Stations built and signed onto the air by either Golden West or by Gene Autry personally.
 3 A late acquisition, Autry kept the station even after the company folded.

Radio

AM Stations

FM Stations

References

External links
Gene Autry's official website

Defunct mass media companies of the United States

Companies based in California
Investment companies